Michael U. Imoh (born July 21, 1984) is a former professional football player, a running back for the Montreal Alouettes of the Canadian Football League.

Early years
Born and raised in Fairfax, Virginia, a suburb southwest of Washington, D.C., Imoh attended Robinson Secondary School and starred as a tailback in football and a sprinter in track. As a senior, he led the Rams to the 6A state championship in football in the fall of 2001 and enrolled at Virginia Tech in Blacksburg in 2002.

College career
Imoh was moved to receiver in his first two seasons at Virginia Tech, as the Hokies had lost all-Big East receiver André Davis to the National Football League, and were in desperate need of help at flanker.

In 2003, Imoh became the first Hokie to return a kickoff for a touchdown since 1992 with his 91-yard return against Connecticut.  Imoh finished the 2003 season as the top kick returner in the Big East and the third highest kick returner nationally.

Following the 2003 season, Imoh and two teammates – Marcus Vick and Brendan Hill – were convicted of contributing to the delinquency of a minor for allegedly serving alcohol to three underage girls.  Imoh was suspended for three games following the incident.

As a junior in 2004, Imoh moved back to tailback. Following his suspension, he quickly won the starting job.  Against North Carolina, Imoh broke the Virginia Tech single game rushing record set the previous year by Kevin Jones.  Due to a record keeping error with the official statistics, Imoh was originally credited with only 236 yards – five short of Jones' total – but Tech's radio statistician noticed a discrepancy between his notes and the official total and was able to have the error corrected.

Notes

External links

 Mike Imoh's Virginia Tech profile
 Mike Imoh's Montreal Alouettes profile

1984 births
Living people
Sportspeople from Fairfax County, Virginia
African-American players of Canadian football
American football running backs
Robinson Secondary School alumni
Virginia Tech Hokies football players
Canadian football running backs
Montreal Alouettes players
21st-century African-American sportspeople
20th-century African-American people